Skopunarfjørður is a strait separating Sandoy and Streymoy in the Faroe Islands. The strait also passes the isle of Hestur.

Geography 
The fjord is bordered by the Tórshavn, Skopun, Sandur and Skálavík municipalities. Incidentally, the  islet belongs to Kirkjubøur (Tórshavn Municipality), even though it is separated by a few meters of water from Sandoy. It is used for grazing sheep.

Skopunarfjørður is named after the village of Skopun. Fjørður in Faroese can refer to either a fjord in the traditional sense or, in this case, a broad strait between islands. It is renowned for its strong tidal current.

The fjord is traditionally used as the boundary between the southern region and the northern Faroe Islands. The region south of the Skopunarfjørður is referred to as sunnanfjørðs while north of it is norðanfjørðs. The strait constitutes a dialectical boundary and isogloss in the Faroese language.

Transport 
Strandfaraskip Landsins operates the car ferry Teistin (route 60) and the cargo ferry Hasfjord (route 85) between Skopun on Sandoy and Gamlarætt on Streymoy, taking 30 minutes for the crossing. In winter the ferries are often cancelled due to adverse weather or swell. There are bus services on either side of the strait. In 2023, the Sandoyartunnilin will open between Gamlarætt and central Sandoy, replacing the ferries with an all-weather alternative.

See also 

 Sandoyartunnilin
 Tangafjørður
 Fjords in the Faroe Islands

References 

Geography of the Faroe Islands
Straits of the Faroe Islands